Ufuk Akcigit (born 23 May 1980) is a Turkish economist. He is the Arnold C. Harberger Professor of Economics at the University of Chicago, the Kenneth C. Griffin Department of Economics since 2019. The same year, he also received the Max Planck-Humboldt Research Award for his achievements in the field of macroeconomics. In 2021, he was named John Simon Guggenheim Fellow and Econometric Society fellow for his work in Economics. In 2022, he received the prestigious Global Economy Prize in Economics from the Kiel Institute in Germany and the Sakıp Sabancı International Research Award.

Life 
Ufuk Akcigit was born to Turkish parents in Germany. He moved back to his hometown Bursa, with his parents when he was four-years old. He earned his middle and high education degrees from Ankara Anatolian High School. He was interested in Mathematics and Economics from an early age. In 2003, he obtained his bachelor's degree in economics from Koç University. Upon graduation, he completed his doctoral studies and earned a Ph.D. degree with his thesis on Industrial Policy and Economic Growth, from MIT in 2009.

Academic career 
After his doctoral studies, Akcigit started working as an assistant professor at the University of Pennsylvania. In 2015, he moved to the University of Chicago as an assistant professor, got promoted to Associate Professor in 2018 and finally to a full Professor in 2019. He is the Arnold C. Harberger Professor since 2020. He recently founded and is running a research group in Chicago that uses large-scale firm and individual level micro datasets to uncover how talent allocation, human capital, industrial policies, competitive landscape, academia, and institutions influence economic growth through innovation and ideas.[6] As winner of the Max Planck-Humboldt Research Award, he also has a dedicated research team in Germany that focuses on the Economic Gap between East and West Germany.

As of 2021, he holds Research Associate positions at the National Bureau of Economic Research, Center for Economic Policy Research, Brookings Institute, Halle Institute, Rimini Centre for Economic Analysis, and CESifo. In 2016, he was named Distinguished Research Fellow by Koc University where he completed his undergraduate studies.

In 2021, he was named Econometric Society Fellow and John Simon Guggenheim Fellow.  In 2022, he received the prestigious Global Economy Prize in Economics from the Kiel Institute in Germany and the Sakıp Sabancı International Research Award.

Research 
As a macroeconomist, Akcigit's research focuses on understanding the links between innovation and economic growth and coming up with optimal policies to bolster them. He has been a pioneer in the field of "Quantitative Economic Growth" which combines economic models with micro-level data to study innovation and economic growth. He focuses on 3 aspects that connect innovation and aggregate economic growth: 1) Firms 2) Inventors 3) Ideas. To understand each aspect, he believes a combination of microeconomic and macroeconomic perspectives should be used.

His first line of research, on firms, consists of several papers that uncover firms in developed and developing countries. He has focused on how firms have different types of innovations, and the quality of these innovations have important economic growth implications. Looking at the life cycle of firms and innovation in developing countries, his work shows that these countries suffer from low creative destruction. He also studies the interplay of taxation and innovation, uncovering what incentives governments provide to firms to innovate using taxes and subsidies.

Furthermore, he investigates the factors determining who becomes an inventor and uncovers that IQ, education and parental background are key ingredients. Switching gears, he is currently working on who becomes an entrepreneur and believes that parental background has a stronger effect on career choice for entrepreneurs than IQ.

As part of his thoughts on creative destruction, Akcigit examines inventors themselves to uncover their incentives to innovate and their effect on society. He focuses on modern-time inventors, historical inventors, and their interactions in society.

Akcigit also focuses on ideas as the "seeds of economic growth". He particularly focuses on how ideas are generated and how they are materialized. He shows that ideas are not necessarily born to the best users to ensure utilization, an established patent system is crucial for idea transformation. He uses large scale datasets such as social security records, firm balance sheets and patent microdata to advance his research.

Taking a step back to look at the business dynamism and market dynamics itself, Akcigit argues that upon decreased knowledge diffusion, corporate market power has risen in recent decades. This resulted in an increased corporate market power and market concentration. He then examines how do firms respond to these changing dynamics in the economy. He uses firm and state based micro data to uncover these effects. With a group of researches from the International Monetary Fund, Akcigit investigated these issues across different countries, publishing their findings on a report entitled "Rising Corporate Market Power: Emerging Policy Issues".

Finally, he focuses on income inequality arguing that  innovation is positively correlated with the former. He uses cross state panel U.S Data to work on income inequality and social mobility.

Awards 
 Econometric Society Fellow
 John Simon Guggenheim Fellow
 Kauffman Junior Faculty Fellow
 Kiel Institute Global Economy Prize in Economics (2022)
 Sakıp Sabancı International Research Award (2022)
 Max Planck-Humboldt Research Award (2019)
 Asaf Savas Akat Economics Prize (2019)
 CAREER Award, National Science Foundation (2017)
 Kiel Institute Excellence Award in Global Economic Affairs (2016)

Selected bibliography 
 Akcigit, U., Celik, M. A., & Greenwood, J. (2016). Buy, Keep, or Sell: Economic Growth and the Market for Ideas. Econometrica, 84(3), 943–984. https://doi.org/10.3982/ecta12144
 Acemoglu, D., Akcigit, U., Alp, H., Bloom, N., & Kerr, W. (2018). Innovation, Reallocation and Growth. American Economic Review, 108(11), 3450 – 3491. https://doi.org/10.3386/w18993
 Akcigit, U., Baslandze, S., & Stantcheva, S. (2015). Taxation and the International Mobility of Inventors. American Economic Review, 106(10), 2930- 2981. https://doi.org/10.3386/w21024
 Akcigit, U., Hanley, D., & Serrano-Velarde, N. (2021). Back to basics: Basic Research Spillovers, Innovation Policy and Growth. , Review of Economic Studies, 88(1), 1-43. https://doi.org/10.3386/w19473
 Akcigit, U., Alp, H., & Peters, M. (2021). Lack of selection and limits to delegation: Firm Dynamics in Developing Countries, American Economic Review, 111(1), 231- 275. https://doi.org/10.3386/w21905
 Akcigit U., Grigsby J., Nicholas T., Stantcheva S. (2021). Taxation and Innovation in the 20th Century, Quarterly Journal of Economics.  https://doi.org/10.1093/qje/qjab022
 Aghion P., Akcigit U., Deaton A., Roulet A. (2016). Creative Destruction and Subjective Well-Being. American Economic Review. 106(12) 3869- 3897.  https://doi.org/10.3386/w21069
 Akcigit U., Ates S. (2021). Ten Facts on Declining Business Dynamism and Lessons from Endogenous Growth Theory. American Economic Journal: Macroeconomics. 13(1), 257- 298.  https://doi.org/10.1257/mac.20180449
 Aghion P., Akcigit U., Blundell A., Hemous D. (2019), Innovation and Top Income Inequality. Review of Economic Studies. 86(1), 1- 45.  https://doi.org/10.1093/restud/rdy027

References 

21st-century Turkish economists
Fellows of the Econometric Society
1980 births
Living people
People from Bursa
University of Chicago faculty
University of Pennsylvania faculty
Koç University alumni
Massachusetts Institute of Technology alumni